Francis John French (born 1941) is a former civil servant from Barton-upon-Humber. He attended Caistor Grammar School before working as an environmental health officer. A member of the Barton Civic Society for over 30 years, he was awarded a MBE in the 2002 New Year Honours for services to the Barton-on-Humber Civic Society.

References

1941 births
People from Barton-upon-Humber
Members of the Order of the British Empire
Living people